The Roman Catholic Diocese of Indore is a diocese of the Roman Catholic Church based in Indore, Madhya Pradesh, India. Founded in 1952 and spread over 3 civil districts of western Madhya Pradesh, it serves an area of 19,073 km².

The bishop of the diocese is Chacko Thottumarickal, S.V.D., born 7 January 1949. He was appointed bishop on 27 March 2002.

List of prelates of Indore
Ecclesiastical superior
 Peter Janser (1931−1935) 
Prefects apostolic
 Peter Janser (1935−1945) 
 Hermann Westermann (1948−1951) 
Bishops
 Frans Simons (1952–1971)
 George M. Anathil (1972−2008)
 Chacko Thottumarickal (since 24 October 2008)

History
 1931 - Established as mission sui iuris
 1935 - Elevated as apostolic prefecture
 1952 - Elevated as diocese

Saints and causes for canonisation
 Bl. Rani Maria Vattalil

References

Diocese of Indore page at catholichierarchy.org  retrieved 13 July 2006
Catholic Bishops' Conference of India: Indore Diocese

Indore
Indore
Christianity in Madhya Pradesh
Christian organizations established in 1952
Roman Catholic dioceses and prelatures established in the 20th century
1952 establishments in India